Kinetic art is art from any medium that contains movement perceivable by the viewer or that depends on motion for its effect. Canvas paintings that extend the viewer's perspective of the artwork and incorporate multidimensional movement are the earliest examples of kinetic art. More pertinently speaking, kinetic art is a term that today most often refers to three-dimensional sculptures and figures such as mobiles that move naturally or are machine operated (see e. g. videos on this page of works of George Rickey, Uli Aschenborn and Sarnikoff). The moving parts are generally powered by wind, a motor or the observer.  Kinetic art encompasses a wide variety of overlapping techniques and styles.

There is also a portion of kinetic art that includes virtual movement, or rather movement perceived from only certain angles or sections of the work. This term also clashes frequently with the term "apparent movement", which many people use when referring to an artwork whose movement is created by motors, machines, or electrically powered systems. Both apparent and virtual movement are styles of kinetic art that only recently have been argued as styles of op art. The amount of overlap between kinetic and op art is not significant enough for artists and art historians to consider merging the two styles under one umbrella term, but there are distinctions that have yet to be made.

"Kinetic art" as a moniker developed from a number of sources. Kinetic art has its origins in the late 19th century impressionist artists such as Claude Monet, Edgar Degas, and Édouard Manet who originally experimented with accentuating the movement of human figures on canvas. This triumvirate of impressionist painters all sought to create art that was more lifelike than their contemporaries. Degas’ dancer and racehorse portraits are examples of what he believed to be "photographic realism";. During the late 19th century artists such as Degas felt the need to challenge the movement toward photography with vivid, cadenced landscapes and portraits.

By the early 1900s, certain artists grew closer and closer to ascribing their art to dynamic motion. Naum Gabo, one of the two artists attributed to naming this style, wrote frequently about his work as examples of "kinetic rhythm". He felt that his moving sculpture Kinetic Construction (also dubbed Standing Wave, 1919–20) was the first of its kind in the 20th century. From the 1920s until the 1960s, the style of kinetic art was reshaped by a number of other artists who experimented with mobiles and new forms of sculpture.

Origins and early development 

The strides made by artists to "lift the figures and scenery off the page and prove undeniably that art is not rigid" (Calder, 1954) took significant innovations and changes in compositional style. Édouard Manet, Edgar Degas, and Claude Monet were the three artists of the 19th century that initiated those changes in the Impressionist movement. Even though they each took unique approaches to incorporating movement in their works, they did so with the intention of being a realist. In the same period, Auguste Rodin was an artist whose early works spoke in support of the developing kinetic movement in art. However, Auguste Rodin's later criticisms of the movement indirectly challenged the abilities of Manet, Degas, and Monet, claiming that it is impossible to exactly capture a moment in time and give it the vitality that is seen in real life.

Édouard Manet 

It is almost impossible to ascribe Manet's work to any one era or style of art. One of his works that is truly on the brink of a new style is Le Ballet Espagnol (1862). The figures' contours coincide with their gestures as a way to suggest depth in relation to one another and in relation to the setting. Manet also accentuates the lack of equilibrium in this work to project to the viewer that he or she is on the edge of a moment that is seconds away from passing. The blurred, hazy sense of color and shadow in this work similarly place the viewer in a fleeting moment.

In 1863, Manet extended his study of movement on flat canvas with Le déjeuner sur l'herbe. The light, color, and composition are the same, but he adds a new structure to the background figures. The woman bending in the background is not completely scaled as if she were far away from the figures in the foreground. The lack of spacing is Manet's method of creating snapshot, near-invasive movement similar to his blurring of the foreground objects in Le Ballet Espagnol.

Edgar Degas 

Edgar Degas is believed to be the intellectual extension of Manet, but more radical for the impressionist community. Degas' subjects are the epitome of the impressionist era; he finds great inspiration in images of ballet dancers and horse races. His "modern subjects" never obscured his objective of creating moving art. In his 1860 piece Jeunes Spartiates s'exerçant à la lutte, he capitalizes on the classic impressionist nudes but expands on the overall concept. He places them in a flat landscape and gives them dramatic gestures, and for him this pointed to a new theme of "youth in movement".

One of his most revolutionary works, L’Orchestre de l’Opéra (1868) interprets forms of definite movement and gives them multidimensional movement beyond the flatness of the canvas. He positions the orchestra directly in the viewer's space, while the dancers completely fill the background. Degas is alluding to the Impressionist style of combining movement, but almost redefines it in a way that was seldom seen in the late 1800s. In the 1870s, Degas continues this trend through his love of one-shot motion horse races in such works as Voiture aux Courses (1872).

It wasn't until 1884 with Chevaux de Course that his attempt at creating dynamic art came to fruition. This work is part of a series of horse races and polo matches wherein the figures are well integrated into the landscape. The horses and their owners are depicted as if caught in a moment of intense deliberation, and then trotting away casually in other frames. The impressionist and overall artistic community were very impressed with this series, but were also shocked when they realized he based this series on actual photographs. Degas was not fazed by the criticisms of his integration of photography, and it actually inspired Monet to rely on similar technology.

Claude Monet 

Degas and Monet's style was very similar in one way: both of them based their artistic interpretation on a direct "retinal impression" to create the feeling of variation and movement in their art. The subjects or images that were the foundation of their paintings came from an objective view of the world. As with Degas, many art historians consider that to be the subconscious effect photography had in that period of time. His 1860s works reflected many of the signs of movement that are visible in Degas' and Manet's work.

By 1875, Monet's touch becomes very swift in his new series, beginning with Le Bâteau-Atelier sur la Seine. The landscape almost engulfs the whole canvas and has enough motion emanating from its inexact brushstrokes that the figures are a part of the motion. This painting along with Gare Saint-Lazare (1877-1878), proves to many art historians that Monet was redefining the style of the Impressionist era. Impressionism initially was defined by isolating color, light, and movement. In the late 1870s, Monet had pioneered a style that combined all three, while maintaining a focus on the popular subjects of the Impressionist era. Artists were often so struck by Monet's wispy brushstrokes that it was more than movement in his paintings, but a striking vibration.

Auguste Rodin
Auguste Rodin at first was very impressed by Monet's 'vibrating works' and Degas' unique understanding of spatial relationships. As an artist and an author of art reviews, Rodin published multiple works supporting this style. He claimed that Monet and Degas' work created the illusion "that art captures life through good modeling and movement". In 1881, when Rodin first sculpted and produced his own works of art, he rejected his earlier notions. Sculpting put Rodin into a predicament that he felt no philosopher nor anyone could ever solve; how can artists impart movement and dramatic motions from works so solid as sculptures? After this conundrum occurred to him, he published new articles that didn't attack men such as Manet, Monet, and Degas intentionally, but propagated his own theories that Impressionism is not about communicating movement but presenting it in static form.

20th century surrealism and early kinetic art 
The surrealist style of the 20th century created an easy transition into the style of kinetic art. All artists now explored subject matter that would not have been socially acceptable to depict artistically. Artists went beyond solely painting landscapes or historical events, and felt the need to delve into the mundane and the extreme to interpret new styles. With the support of artists such as Albert Gleizes, other avant-garde artists such as Jackson Pollock and Max Bill felt as if they had found new inspiration to discover oddities that became the focus of kinetic art.

Albert Gleizes 
Gleizes was considered the ideal philosopher of the late 19th century and early 20th century arts in Europe, and more specifically France. His theories and treatises from 1912 on cubism gave him a renowned reputation in any artistic discussion. This reputation is what allowed him to act with considerable influence when supporting the plastic style or the rhythmic movement of art in the 1910s and 1920s. Gleizes published a theory on movement, which further articulated his theories on the psychological, artistic uses of movement in conjunction with the mentality that arises when considering movement. Gleizes asserted repeatedly in his publications that human creation implies the total renunciation of external sensation. That to him is what made art mobile when to many, including Rodin, it was rigidly and unflinchingly immobile.

Gleizes first stressed the necessity for rhythm in art. To him, rhythm meant the visually pleasant coinciding of figures in a two-dimensional or three-dimensional space. Figures should be spaced mathematically, or systematically so that they appeared to interact with one another. Figures should also not have features that are too definite. They need to have shapes and compositions that are almost unclear, and from there the viewer can believe that the figures themselves are moving in that confined space. He wanted paintings, sculptures, and even the flat works of mid-19th-century artists to show how figures could impart on the viewer that there was great movement contained in a certain space. As a philosopher, Gleizes also studied the concept of artistic movement and how that appealed to the viewer. Gleizes updated his studies and publications through the 1930s, just as kinetic art was becoming popular.

Jackson Pollock 
When Jackson Pollock created many of his famous works, the United States was already at the forefront of the kinetic and popular art movements.  The novel styles and methods he used to create his most famous pieces earned him the spot in the 1950s as the unchallenged leader of kinetic painters, his work was associated with Action painting coined by art critic Harold Rosenberg in the 1950s.  Pollock had an unfettered desire to animate every aspect of his paintings.  Pollock repeatedly said to himself, "I am in every painting". He used tools that most painters would never use, such as sticks, trowels, and knives. He thought of the shapes he created as being "beautiful, erratic objects".

This style evolved into his drip technique. Pollock repeatedly took buckets of paint and paintbrushes and flicked them around until the canvas was covered with squiggly lines and jagged strokes. In the next phase of his work, Pollock tested his style with uncommon materials. He painted his first work with aluminum paint in 1947, titled Cathedral and from there he tried his first "splashes" to destroy the unity of the material itself.  He believed wholeheartedly that he was liberating the materials and structure of art from their forced confinements, and that is how he arrived at the moving or kinetic art that always existed.

Max Bill 
Max Bill became an almost complete disciple of the kinetic movement in the 1930s. He believed that kinetic art should be executed from a purely mathematical perspective.  To him, using mathematics principles and understandings were one of the few ways that you could create objective movement.  This theory applied to every artwork he created and how he created it. Bronze, marble, copper, and brass were four of the materials he used in his sculptures.  He also enjoyed tricking the viewer's eye when he or she first approached one of his sculptures.  In his Construction with Suspended Cube (1935-1936) he created a mobile sculpture that generally appears to have perfect symmetry, but once the viewer glances at it from a different angle, there are aspects of asymmetry.

Mobiles and sculpture 
Max Bill's sculptures were only the beginning of the style of movement that kinetic explored. Tatlin, Rodchenko, and Calder especially took the stationary sculptures of the early 20th century and gave them the slightest freedom of motion. These three artists began with testing unpredictable movement, and from there tried to control the movement of their figures with technological enhancements. The term "mobile" comes from the ability to modify how gravity and other atmospheric conditions affect the artist's work.

Although there is very little distinction between the styles of mobiles in kinetic art, there is one distinction that can be made. Mobiles are no longer considered mobiles when the spectator has control over their movement. This is one of the features of virtual movement. When the piece only moves under certain circumstances that are not natural, or when the spectator controls the movement even slightly, the figure operates under virtual movement.

Kinetic art principles have also influenced mosaic art. For instance, kinetic-influenced mosaic pieces often use clear distinctions between bright and dark tiles, with three-dimensional shape, to create apparent shadows and movement.

Vladimir Tatlin 
Russian artist and founder-member of the Russian Constructivism movement Vladimir Tatlin is considered by many artists and art historians  to be the first person to ever complete a mobile sculpture.  The term mobile wasn't coined until Rodchenko's time,  but is very applicable to Tatlin's work. His mobile is a series of suspended reliefs that only need a wall or a pedestal, and it would forever stay suspended. This early mobile, Contre-Reliefs Libérés Dans L'espace (1915) is judged as an incomplete work. It was a rhythm, much similar to the rhythmic styles of Pollock, that relied on the mathematical interlocking of planes that created a work freely suspended in air. 

Tatlin's Tower or the project for the 'Monument to the Third International' (1919–20), was a design for a monumental kinetic architecture building that was never built. It was planned to be erected in Petrograd (now St. Petersburg) after the Bolshevik Revolution of 1917, as the headquarters and monument of the Comintern (the Third International).

Tatlin never felt that his art was an object or a product that needed a clear beginning or a clear end. He felt above anything that his work was an evolving process. Many artists whom he befriended considered the mobile truly complete in 1936, but he disagreed vehemently.

Alexander Rodchenko 

Russian artist Alexander Rodchenko, Tatlin's friend and peer who insisted his work was complete, continued the study of suspended mobiles and created what he deemed to be "non-objectivism". This style was a study less focused on mobiles than on canvas paintings and objects that were immovable. It focuses on juxtaposing objects of different materials and textures as a way to spark new ideas in the mind of the viewer. By creating discontinuity with the work, the viewer assumed that the figure was moving off the canvas or the medium to which it was restricted. One of his canvas works titled Dance, an Objectless Composition (1915) embodies that desire to place items and shapes of different textures and materials together to create an image that drew in the viewer's focus.

However, by the 1920s and 1930s, Rodchenko found a way to incorporate his theories of non-objectivism in mobile study. His 1920 piece Hanging Construction is a wood mobile that hangs from any ceiling by a string and rotates naturally. This mobile sculpture has concentric circles that exist in several planes, but the entire sculpture only rotates horizontally and vertically.

Alexander Calder 

Alexander Calder is an artist who many believe to have defined firmly and exactly the style of mobiles in kinetic art. Over years of studying his works, many critics allege that Calder was influenced by a wide variety of sources. Some claim that Chinese windbells were objects that closely resembled the shape and height of his earliest mobiles. Other art historians argue that the 1920s mobiles of Man Ray, including Shade (1920) had a direct influence on the growth of Calder's art.

When Calder first heard of these claims, he immediately admonished his critics. "I have never been and never will be a product of anything more than myself. My art is my own, why bother stating something about my art that isn’t true?" One of Calder's first mobiles, Mobile (1938) was the work that "proved" to many art historians that Man Ray had an obvious influence on Calder's style. Both Shade and Mobile have a single string attached to a wall or a structure that keeps it in the air. The two works have a crinkled feature that vibrates when air passes through it.

Regardless of the obvious similarities, Calder's style of mobiles created two types that are now referred to as the standard in kinetic art. There are object-mobiles and suspended mobiles. Object mobiles on supports come in a wide range of shapes and sizes and can move in any way. Suspended mobiles were first made with colored glass and small wooden objects that hung on long threads. Object mobiles were a part of Calder's emerging style of mobiles that were originally stationary sculptures.

It can be argued, based on their similar shape and stance, that Calder's earliest object mobiles have very little to do with kinetic art or moving art. By the 1960s, most art critics believed that Calder had perfected the style of object mobiles in such creations as the Cat Mobile (1966). In this piece, Calder allows the cat's head and its tail to be subject to random motion, but its body is stationary. Calder did not start the trend in suspended mobiles, but he was the artist that became recognized for his apparent originality in mobile construction.

One of his earliest suspended mobiles, McCausland Mobile (1933), is different from many other contemporary mobiles simply because of the shapes of the two objects. Most mobile artists such as Rodchenko and Tatlin would never have thought to use such shapes because they didn't seem malleable or even remotely aerodynamic.

Despite the fact that Calder did not divulge most of the methods he used when creating his work, he admitted that he used mathematical relationships to make them. He only said that he created a balanced mobile by using direct variation proportions of weight and distance. Calder's formulas changed with every new mobile he made, so other artists could never precisely imitate the work.

Virtual movement 
By the 1940s, new styles of mobiles, as well as many types of sculpture and paintings, incorporated the control of the spectator. Artists such as Calder, Tatlin, and Rodchenko produced more art through the 1960s, but they were also competing against other artists who appealed to different audiences. When artists such as Victor Vasarely developed a number of the first features of virtual movement in their art, kinetic art faced heavy criticism. This criticism lingered for years until the 1960s, when kinetic art was in a dormant period.

Materials and electricity 
Vasarely created many works that were considered to be interactive in the 1940s. One of his works Gordes/Cristal (1946) is a series of cubic figures that are also electrically powered. When he first showed these figures at fairs and art exhibitions, he invited people up to the cubic shapes to press the switch and start the color and light show. Virtual movement is a style of kinetic art that can be associated with mobiles, but from this style of movement there are two more specific distinctions of kinetic art.

Apparent movement and op art 
Apparent movement is a term ascribed to kinetic art that evolved only in the 1950s. Art historians believed that any type of kinetic art that was mobile independent of the viewer has apparent movement. This style includes works that range from Pollock's drip technique all the way to Tatlin's first mobile. By the 1960s, other art historians developed the phrase "op art" to refer to optical illusions and all optically stimulating art that was on canvas or stationary. This phrase often clashes with certain aspects of kinetic art that include mobiles that are generally stationary.

In 1955, for the exhibition Mouvements at the Denise René gallery in Paris, Victor Vasarely and Pontus Hulten promoted in their "Yellow manifesto" some new kinetic expressions based on optical and luminous phenomenon as well as painting illusionism. The expression "kinetic art" in this modern form first appeared at the Museum für Gestaltung of Zürich in 1960, and found its major developments in the 1960s. In most European countries, it generally included the form of optical art that mainly makes use of optical illusions, such as op art, represented by Bridget Riley, as well as art based on movement represented by Yacov Agam, Carlos Cruz-Diez, Jesús Rafael Soto, Gregorio Vardanega, Martha Boto or Nicolas Schöffer. From 1961 to 1968, GRAV (Groupe de Recherche d’Art Visuel) founded by François Morellet, Julio Le Parc, Francisco Sobrino, Horacio Garcia Rossi, Yvaral, Joël Stein and Vera Molnár was a collective group of opto-kinetic artists. According to its 1963 manifesto, GRAV appealed to the direct participation of the public with an influence on its behavior, notably through the use of interactive labyrinths.

Contemporary work
In November 2013, the MIT Museum opened 5000 Moving Parts, an exhibition of kinetic art, featuring the work of Arthur Ganson, Anne Lilly, Rafael Lozano-Hemmer, John Douglas Powers, and Takis.  The exhibition inaugurates a "year of kinetic art" at the Museum, featuring special programming related to the artform.

Neo-kinetic art has been popular in China where you can find interactive kinetic sculptures in many public places, including Wuhu International Sculpture Park and in Beijing.

Changi Airport, Singapore has a curated collection of artworks including large-scale kinetic installations by international artists ART+COM and Christian Moeller.

Selected works

Selected kinetic sculptors 

Yaacov Agam
Uli Aschenborn
David Ascalon
Fletcher Benton
Mark Bischof
Daniel Buren
Alexander Calder
Gregorio Vardanega
Martha Boto
U-Ram Choe
Angela Conner
Carlos Cruz-Diez
Marcel Duchamp
Lin Emery
Rowland Emett
Arthur Ganson
Nemo Gould
Gerhard von Graevenitz
Bruce Gray
Ralfonso Gschwend
Rafael Lozano-Hemmer
Chuck Hoberman
Anthony Howe
Irma Hünerfauth 
Tim Hunkin
Theo Jansen
Ned Kahn
Roger Katan
Starr Kempf
Frederick Kiesler
Viacheslav Koleichuk
Gyula Kosice
Gilles Larrain
Julio Le Parc
Liliane Lijn
Len Lye
Sal Maccarone
Heinz Mack
Phyllis Mark
László Moholy-Nagy
Alejandro Otero
Robert Perless
Otto Piene
George Rickey
Ken Rinaldo
Barton Rubenstein
Nicolas Schöffer
Eusebio Sempere
Jesús Rafael Soto
Mark di Suvero
Takis
Jean Tinguely
Wen-Ying Tsai
Marc van den Broek
Panayiotis Vassilakis
Willem van Weeghel
Lyman Whitaker
Ludwig Wilding

Selected kinetic op artists 

Nadir Afonso
Getulio Alviani
Marina Apollonio
Carlos Cruz-Díez
Ronald Mallory
Youri Messen-Jaschin
Vera Molnár
Abraham Palatnik
Bridget Riley
Eusebio Sempere
Grazia Varisco
Victor Vasarely
Jean-Pierre Yvaral
Romano Rizzato

See also 

 
 Gas sculpture
 Lumino kinetic art
 Odonien
 Robotic art
 Sound art
 Sound installation

References

Further reading

External links

 Kinetic Art Organization (KAO) – Largest International Kinetic Art Organisation (Kinetic Art film and book library, KAO Museum planned)

 
Modern art
Types of sculpture
Motion (physics)
Contemporary art
Visual arts genres